McGinty, known in Australia as Mr McGinty, was a Group 1 winning New Zealand bred and trained race-horse and sire.

Racing career

The son of One Pound Sterling was the winner of six Group One races and a total of 14 races. He was trained by Colin Jillings at Takanini for race commentator Keith Haub and co-owner Barney McCahill.  He was usually ridden by Robert Vance.

McGinty was outstanding as a young horse and had six wins and a second from seven starts as a 2-year old horse and four wins and two places from eight starts as a 3-year old.  He was the top-weighted horse on the NZ 1981-82 Two-Year-Old Free Handicap and was top colt on the 1982-83 NZ Three Year Old Free Handicap. His Group One wins came in the Air New Zealand Stakes (twice), Rawson Stakes, Canterbury Guineas, Caulfield Stakes and George Adams Handicap.

His standout moment was when he beat the champion Australian 2YO Marscay in the Todman Slipper Trial. Not only did he beat Marscay, who went on to win the Golden Slipper and was subsequently crowned Australia's Champion 2YO, he defeated him running on 3 legs, having cracked his cannon bone at the top of the straight.

Notable results included:
 1st – October 1981 – Sapling Stakes (880m) beating Village Kid and Tigertron.
 1st – December 1981– Avondale Stakes (1200m) beating Calere and Long Range. 
 1st – January 1982 – Great Northern Foal Stakes (1200m) beating Andretti and Long Range. 
 2nd – March 1982 – Eclipse Stakes (1200m) behind Andretti with Beautiful Smidgen third.
 1st – March 1982 – Todman Slipper Trial (1200m) beating Marscay and Duke Diamond.  In this race McGinty won with a cracked cannon-bone and two missing front shoes.
 6th – January 1983 –  Railway Stakes (1200m), ridden by Lance O'Sullivan, behind So Dandy and Our Shah. 
 1st – January 1983 – Wellington Stakes (1600m) for 3YOs at Trentham Racecourse – beating Bight Plume and Glamour Star. 
 1st – January 1983 – WRC George Adams Handicap (1600m), ridden by Jim Cassidy, beating Ringtue and Jon in 1:32.99.  This was the first time the 1:33 mile mark was broken in New Zealand.
 1st – February 1983 – Air New Zealand Stakes (2000m) beating Bellerephon and Maurita.
 1st – March 1983 – Canterbury Guineas (1900m) beating Veloso with Baron Cayne and Chiamare dead-heating for third.
 2nd – March 1983 – Rosehill Guineas (2000m) behind Strawberry Road with Veloso third. 
 3rd – March 1983 – Tancred Stakes (2400m) at Rosehill behind Trissaro and Veloso. 
 7th – April 1983 – AJC Derby (2400m) behind Strawberry Road and Veloso.
 2nd – September 1983 – George Main Stakes (1600m) carrying 57kg behind Emancipation 54.5kg with Rare Form 58.5kg third. 
 1st – October 1983 – Caulfield Stakes (2000m) beating Cossack Prince and Cool River.
 3rd – October 1983 – Cox Plate behind Strawberry Road and Kiwi Slave.
 2nd – November 1983 – Queen Elizabeth Stakes (VRC) (2500m) behind Fountaincourt with Mr Jazz third.
 5th – November 1983 – Japan Cup (2400m) behind Stanerra and Kyoei Promise.
 4th – February 1984 – Waikato Sprint (1400m) behind Abit Leica, Final Affair and Ebony Belle.  
 1st – February 1984 – Air New Zealand Stakes (2000m) beating Silver Row and Isle of Man.
 3rd – March 1984 – Chipping Norton Stakes (1600m) carrying 57kg behind Emancipation 55.5kg and Trissaro 57.5kg.  
 1st – March 1984 – Rawson Stakes (2000m) beating Trissaro and Admiral Lincoln.

His final race was a 12th out of 14 runners in the 1984 Tancred Stakes behind Hayai at Rosehill on 14 April 1984.

Stud career

McGinty began stud duties in 1984 and sired six Group One winners.

Notable offspring included:
 Jolly Old Mac, winner of the 1992 Australian Guineas.
 Marconee, winner of the 1995 Enerco Stakes
 Miltak, winner of the 1994 Auckland Cup and BMW Stakes. 
 The Gentry, winner of the 1988 New Zealand Derby and 1989 New Zealand Stakes. 
 The Hind, winner of the 1998 Adelaide Cup.

On 6 June 2001 McGinty died from a heart attack at Progressive Farms in Karaka at the age of 21.

See also
Thoroughbred racing in New Zealand

References 

Racehorses bred in New Zealand
Racehorses trained in New Zealand
New Zealand Thoroughbred sires
1979 racehorse births
 2001 racehorse deaths